Duncan is an unincorporated community in Webster and Wright counties, in the U.S. state of Missouri.

Duncan is located along Missouri Route 38 on the Webster - Wright county line and about midway between Marshfield to the west and Hartville to the east. It is at the headquarters of Cantrell Creek which flows to the northwest.

History
A post office called Duncan was established on the Webster County side in 1871, where it remained in operation until 1923. The community has the name of the local Duncan family.

References

Unincorporated communities in Webster County, Missouri
Unincorporated communities in Wright County, Missouri
Unincorporated communities in Missouri